Post at Grand River Indian Agency was a Federal military post at the Grand River Indian Agency between 1870 and 1875 in the Dakota Territory.  It was located at the Missouri and Grand Rivers, near modern Wakpala, Corson County, South Dakota within the Standing Rock Indian Reservation.

Periodic flooding forced the transfer of the Indian Agency and the garrison to Fort Yates in North Dakota.  The site is now underwater beneath Lake Oahe.

References 
  South Dakota historical collections, Volume 8, Dept. of History, South Dakota State Historical Society, South Dakota, 1916, pp. 97-98 Map of site included.

Closed installations of the United States Army
Forts in South Dakota
Buildings and structures in Corson County, South Dakota
Pre-statehood history of South Dakota